The Pont Grand is a stone bridge connecting Tournon-sur-Rhône to Saint-Jean-de-Muzols, in Ardèche, France, built between 1379 and 1583. The bridge features a single, semi-circular arch over the river Doux with a span of 49.20 m. The height of the piers is 17.73 m.

See also 
 List of bridges in France
 List of medieval bridges in France
Other very large medieval bridges
 Puente del Diablo (Martorell) (37.3 m span)
 Ponte della Maddalena (37.8 m span)
 Puente de San Martín (Toledo) (40 m span)
 Nyons Bridge (40.53 m span)
 Pont du Diable (Céret) (45.45 m span)
 Castelvecchio Bridge (48.7 m span)
 Pont de Vieille-Brioude (54.2 m span)
 Trezzo sull'Adda Bridge (72 m span)

References 

Bridges in France
Bridges completed in 1583
Pont Grand
Stone bridges in France
Transport in Auvergne-Rhône-Alpes
Stone arch bridges